Sarah Allen (born 1980) is a Canadian actress.

Sarah Allen may also refer to:

 Sarah Allen (software developer), creator of Adobe After Effects, Adobe Shockwave, Flash video
 Sarah Allen (musician), flautist and accordionist, member of Flook
 Sarah Allen (missionary) (1764–1849), "Founding Mother" of the AME Church
 Sarah Addison Allen, American author

See also
 Sarah Allan (born 1945), American historian
 Sarah Allan (footballer) (born 1997), Australian rules footballer
 Sara Allen (born 1954), American songwriter
 Allen (surname)